Mount George is an unincorporated community in Yell County, Arkansas, United States, located at the junction of Arkansas Highways 28 and 154,  south-southwest of Dardanelle.

References

Unincorporated communities in Yell County, Arkansas
Unincorporated communities in Arkansas